John Peter Sarsgaard (born March 7, 1971) is an American actor. His first feature role was in Dead Man Walking in 1995. He then appeared in the 1998 independent films Another Day in Paradise and Desert Blue. That same year, Sarsgaard received a substantial role in The Man in the Iron Mask (1998), playing Raoul, the ill-fated son of Athos. Sarsgaard later achieved critical recognition when he was cast in Boys Don't Cry (1999) as John Lotter. He landed his first leading role in the 2001 film The Center of the World. 

For his portrayal of Charles Lane in Shattered Glass, Sarsgaard received a Golden Globe Award for Best Supporting Actor nomination. Sarsgaard has appeared in an eclectic range of films, including K-19: The Widowmaker (2002), Garden State, Kinsey (both 2004), Jarhead (2005), Flightplan (2005), Elegy (2008), An Education (2009), Lovelace (2013), Night Moves (2013), Blue Jasmine (2013), Black Mass (2015), Jackie (2016), and The Lost Daughter (2021). He is also known for his performances in the blockbuster films Green Lantern (2011), Knight and Day (2010), The Magnificent Seven (2016) and The Batman (2022). 
 
Sarsgaard is also known for his television roles including the AMC/Netflix crime series The Killing (2013). He portrayed Martin Schmidt in the Hulu series The Looming Tower for which he received a Critics' Choice Television Award for Best Supporting Actor in a Movie/Miniseries nomination. In 2021, he had a main role on the Hulu miniseries Dopesick, for which he was nominated for the Primetime Emmy Award for Outstanding Supporting Actor in a Limited or Anthology Series or Movie. Sarsgaard has appeared in Off-Broadway productions including Kingdom of Earth, Laura Dennis, Burn This, and Uncle Vanya. In September 2008, he made his Broadway debut as Boris Alexeyevich Trigorin in The Seagull. He is married to Maggie Gyllenhaal.

Early life
John Peter Sarsgaard was born at Scott Air Force Base in St. Clair County, Illinois, on March 7, 1971, the son of Judy Lea (née Reinhardt) and John Dale Sarsgaard. His father was an Air Force engineer and later worked for Monsanto and IBM. His surname originates in Denmark, where his paternal great-great-grandparents were born; it is pronounced  in Danish. 

Sarsgaard was raised a Catholic and served as an altar boy. His family moved more than 12 times during his childhood, following his father's job. At the age of 7, Sarsgaard originally wanted to become a soccer player and took up ballet to help improve his coordination. After suffering several concussions while playing soccer, he gave up the sport and became interested in writing and theater. He attended Fairfield College Preparatory School, a private Jesuit boys' school in Connecticut, where he became interested in film. 

Following his graduation from Fairfield Prep in 1989, he attended Bard College in New York for two years before transferring to Washington University in St. Louis (WUSTL) in 1991, where he co-founded an improvisational comedy troupe "Mama's Pot Roast". While at WUSTL, Sarsgaard began performing in plays in an offshoot of New York's Actors Studio; His first role was as the servant Laurent in Molière's Tartuffe. In 1993, he graduated with a bachelor's degree in history and moved to New York.

Career

1995–1998: Early work
Sarsgaard branched out with guest roles in television productions filmed in New York City, with Law & Order in 1995, and New York Undercover (1997) as well as an appearance in the 1997 HBO special Subway Stories. He appeared in his first film role in Dead Man Walking (1995), where he was cast as a murdered teenager, killed by Sean Penn's character.

In 1995, Sarsgaard made his theatrical debut in the Off-Broadway production of Horton Foote's Laura Dennis, which was directed by James Houghton. Ben Brantley of The New York Times wrote: "Mr. Sarsgaard ... emerges as an actor to watch with a performance of breathtaking emotional conviction." The following year he starred in Kingdom of Earth opposite Cynthia Nixon and directed by John Cameron Mitchell. His performance in the play received favorable reviews amongst critics.

His next film roles were in a series of independent features: Another Day in Paradise (1997), part of an ensemble cast that included James Woods, Melanie Griffith, Vincent Kartheiser, and Natasha Gregson Wagner, and In Desert Blue (1998), where he had a supporting role in the film. He received a substantial role in the 1998 film The Man in the Iron Mask, where he played Raoul, the ill-fated son of John Malkovich's dueling Musketeer, Athos. The film uses characters from Alexandre Dumas' d'Artagnan Romances, and is very loosely adapted from some plot elements of The Vicomte de Bragelonne. The film received ambivalent reviews, but was a success at the box office, earning $182 million worldwide.

1999–2002: Worldwide recognition
In 1999, Sarsgaard earned critical recognition in Kimberly Peirce's Boys Don't Cry, where he was cast as notorious killer John Lotter. The film is based on the real-life story of Brandon Teena, who was raped and murdered in 1993 by Lotter and Tom Nissen after they found out that he was a trans man. Boys Don't Cry received overwhelmingly positive acclaim from critics, and his performance was critically well received. According to The Boston Globe, "Peter  Sarsgaard ... makes the killer's terrible trajectory not only believable, but grounded in the most mundane clodhopper behavior. He isn't a drooling monster, he's a guy you wouldn't look  twice at a bar or a convenience store." A contributor from the Seattle Post-Intelligencer wrote "It's a marvelous performance supported ably by ... Sarsgaard as the unpredictable, sociopathic Lotter." The film was screened at a special presentation at the 2000 Venice Film Festival. In regards to his character, as how Sarsgaard made him "likeable, sympathetic even" was because he wanted the audience "to understand why they would hang out with me. If my character wasn't necessarily likable, I wanted him to be charismatic enough that you weren't going to have a dull time if you were with him." In another interview, Sarsgaard said he felt "empowered" by playing Lotter.

His first leading role was in the 2001 feature The Center of the World, where he plays Richard Longman, a lonely young entrepreneur who skips out on his company's big initial public offering and pays a stripper (Molly Parker) $10,000 to fly to Las Vegas with him. The film received average reviews, however, A.O. Scott of the New York Times, reported that the performances by both Sarsgaard and Parker "provide a rough grain of authenticity, capturing the blunted affect and aimless neediness of people in their 20s struggling to navigate a world of material abundance and impoverished emotional possibility." Scott concluded in his recap that Sarsgaard made his character "seem like a genuinely nice guy, too innocent to grasp the sleaziness of his bargain with Florence."

In 2002, Sarsgaard starred in three films, K-19: The Widowmaker, Empire and The Salton Sea. In K-19: The Widowmaker, he portrayed a young Russian navy lieutenant. The film's budget cost was $100 million to make, but upon release, it grossed $35 million in the United States and $30 million internationally, qualifying it as a box office failure. His next role was in Empire, a crime thriller, where he was cast in a supporting role. Sarsgaard played a meth addict in D. J. Caruso's The Salton Sea. In October 2002, Sarsgaard returned to theater in a New York production of Lanford Wilson's Burn This, where he replaced Edward Norton.

2003–present: Continued success
2003 marked a significant turning point in Sarsgaard's career when he starred in the feature film Shattered Glass. He depicted journalist Charles Lane, the lead editor of The New Republic. Shattered Glass is based on the real events of journalist Stephen Glass' career at The New Republic during the mid-1990s and his fall when his widespread journalistic fraud is exposed. During the film's promotion, Sarsgaard noted his portrayal of Lane: "I just wanted to get his perspective on the actual events. [...] I think that I tried to have some respect for myself and that way you're respecting the real person you're playing. I've done it a number of times. And it's always a little bit confusing. The best thing to do is just to ignore the fact, I think, that you're playing somebody who is a real-life character." According to the San Diego Union-Tribune, "Peter Sarsgaard is appealingly level, a stolid straight-shooter as Lane". A reviewer from the Chicago Tribune noted that Sarsgaard plays Lane with "great subtlety and grace". The newspaper concluded with, "The character doesn't seethe with personal resentment; when he does a slow burn, he conveys a much deeper sense of a man's value system being violated past the breaking point." Sarsgaard's performance in the film earned him his first Golden Globe Award nomination and an Independent Spirit Award nomination.

Following the success of Shattered Glass, Sarsgaard starred in several roles. In 2004, he starred in the comedy-drama Garden State, where he played Mark, the sarcastic best friend to Zach Braff's character. In the same year, Sarsgaard portrayed Clyde Martin, in the biographical film Kinsey, a movie about the life of Alfred Kinsey, played by Liam Neeson. Kinsey was Sarsgaard's first film role which featured full frontal nudity. Paul Clinton of CNN reported that Sarsgaard's Clyde Martin "stands out" and "confirms that he's without doubt one of the best character actors of his generation." When asked about his kissing scenes with Neeson in Kinsey, Sarsgaard said:
It wasn't as hard as, say, running around with all my gear on in Jarhead. I'd rather go for an awkward moment than physical exertion any day. The only thing that I think [male actors] get freaked out about when they have to do something like kiss a guy in a movie—when to their knowledge they're straight—is that they're afraid they're going to be turned on. And if you're not afraid that you're going to be turned on—meaning that you know what you like—then really it's not that hard.

In 2005, Sarsgaard starred in the drama The Dying Gaul, where he plays Robert Sandrich, a struggling screenwriter who has written a serious love story about a man and his terminally ill partner. The film received favourable reviews. In an interview, Sarsgaard said, he felt like he was playing a character based on Craig Lucas, the director, whom he describes as "elitist in a fun way". Because his character, a screenwriter, is also "elitist," when he sells his soul by compromising his artistic vision, "...the conflict seems bigger. Anyone can sell their soul. Even people with integrity. There's always that temptation to guard against. Which is why it's best to keep as much as possible hidden."

Also in 2005, he had supporting roles in the suspense thriller films The Skeleton Key and Robert Schwentke's Flightplan. In the latter film, Sarsgaard played an air marshall, who is ordered to keep guard of Jodie Foster's character. Flightplan was screened at a special presentation at the 30th annual Toronto International Film Festival in 2005. Despite the mixed reviews, the film was a financial success, earning $223 million worldwide, making it his highest-grossing film to the end of 2008. Sarsgaard's next feature was Jarhead (2005), opposite Jake Gyllenhaal. The movie is based on U.S. Marine Anthony Swofford's 2003 Gulf War memoir of the same name.

Sarsgaard hosted Saturday Night Live (SNL) on January 21, 2006. In his introductory monologue, he tried to point out that he was a nice guy despite his sometimes macabre roles. Video clips were then played of Sarsgaard scaring the SNL cast. One sketch featured the severe acute respiratory syndrome (SARS) global scare, which was still fresh in many minds, and one of the skits included a promotion for the Peter Sarsgaard "SARS-Guard", a reference to facemasks.

In 2007, he starred in supporting roles in Year of the Dog and Rendition. Year of the Dog is a dark comedy about a lonely middle-aged woman, played by Molly Shannon, who finds that animals are the only beings she can truly rely on. Sarsgaard plays Newt, an androgynous dog trainer, and love interest for Shannon's character. He starred alongside Meryl Streep, Alan Arkin, Reese Witherspoon, and Jake Gyllenhaal in Rendition, a Gavin Hood-directed political thriller about the US policy of extraordinary rendition. Viewed as a sex symbol, Sarsgaard was named one of Salon.com's Sexiest Man Living in 2007. 2008 saw Sarsgaard star in the drama Elegy, based on a Phillip Roth novel, The Dying Animal. The film received favorable reception amongst critics.

In 2008, Sarsgaard made his Broadway debut at the Royal Court Theatre of Anton Chekhov's adaptation The Seagull alongside Kristin Scott Thomas, Mackenzie Crook and Carey Mulligan. In the production, he plays, Boris Alexeyevich Trigorin, a tortured writer who drives a rival to suicide and a young lover to ruin. For the role, Sarsgaard had been required to speak in a British accent, in which he wanted it to be "less liked by an American audience".

In 2009, Sarsgaard starred alongside Jon Foster and Sienna Miller in the drama The Mysteries of Pittsburgh. It is an adaptation of Michael Chabon's novel of the same name. In the movie, Sarsgaard plays Cleveland, the rebellious bisexual boyfriend of Miller's character. The Mysteries of Pittsburgh premiered at the 2008 Sundance Film Festival. His next film appearance was in the thriller Orphan, where he and Vera Farmiga play a married couple who lose a baby and adopt a nine-year-old girl, who is not as innocent as she claims to be. Furthermore, in the same year, Sarsgaard starred as David in Lone Scherfig's coming of age film An Education. The role required Sarsgaard to speak in a British accent. An Education drew favorable reviews from critics. According to Variety, "Sarsgaard ... marvelously expresses the savoir faire that has such an impact on Jenny [Carey Mulligan]." 

Sarsgaard played Mikhail Lvovich Astrov, a country doctor and philosopher, in the Classic Stage Company's 2009 off-Broadway production of Anton Chekhov's Uncle Vanya in New York City. The cast also included Maggie Gyllenhaal, Mamie Gummer, Denis O'Hare, and George Morfogen. The production, directed by Austin Pendleton, began previews on January 17 and ended its limited run on March 1. Joe Dziemianowicz of the New York Daily News gave the production one out of four stars, but complimented his performance, writing that Sarsgaard does a "credible job as the doctor". In the Bloomberg review of Uncle Vanya, John Simon, wrote: "Sarsgaard can't find the right tempi or emphases: shuttling between colorless rattle and silence-studded rallentandos, he fails at both infectious enthusiasm and self-effacing charm." Sarsgaard played a federal agent in the action comedy film Knight and Day, released in June 2010, in which he appeared alongside Tom Cruise and Cameron Diaz. 

In May 2010, it was reported that Sarsgaard would star in Chekhov's play Three Sisters. The production began in January 2011, and Sarsgaard was reunited with Uncle Vanya director Austin Pendleton. In February 2010, it was announced that Sarsgaard had been cast as villain Hector Hammond in the superhero film Green Lantern. The film was released in 2011. Sarsgaard appeared in a 2015 Classic Stage Company production of Hamlet in the title role. Subsequent film roles include Blue Jasmine (2013), Jackie (2016), The Lost Daughter (2021), directed by his wife Maggie Gyllenhaal, and The Batman (2022). Sarsgaard also appeared in the American TV series The Killing (2013) as a man on death row perhaps wrongfully convicted for the brutal murder of his wife—a performance which he says included "some of the best acting I have ever done in my life." and The Looming Tower. For his role in the 2021 miniseries Dopesick, he received a Primetime Emmy Award nomination.

Personal life

In an interview with The New York Times, Sarsgaard stated that he followed Catholicism, saying: "I like the death-cult aspect of Catholicism. Every religion is interested in death, but Catholicism takes it to a particularly high level. [...] Seriously, in Catholicism, you're supposed to love your enemy. That really impressed me as a kid, and it has helped me as an actor. [...] The way that I view the characters I play is part of my religious upbringing. To abandon curiosity in all personalities, good or bad, is to give up hope in humanity."

Among his most notable romantic relationships, Sarsgaard dated burlesque dancer Dita Von Teese and model and actress Shalom Harlow. Early in his film career, he dated photographer Malerie Marder, a close friend from his days attending Bard College, who had featured Sarsgaard in some of her early work.

Sarsgaard began a romantic relationship with actress Maggie Gyllenhaal, the sister of his close friend Jake Gyllenhaal, in 2002. In April 2006, they announced their engagement, and on May 2, 2009, they married in a small ceremony in Brindisi, Italy. They have two daughters, born in October 2006 and April 2012.

Sarsgaard is vegan, but says he cooks meat for his children.

In June 2013, Sarsgaard and numerous other celebrities appeared in a video showing support for Chelsea Manning.

Filmography

Film

Television

Theatre

Awards and nominations

References

Further reading
Charaipotra, Sona. "Celebrity Q&A – Peter Sarsgaard". People. November 12, 2004. Accessed February 23, 2009.
Nechak, Paula. "A moment with ... Peter Sarsgaard, actor". Seattle Post-Intelligencer. May 27, 2005. Accessed December 18, 2008.
Moss, Corey. "Peter Sarsgaard 'Dying' For Diverse Roles". MTV Movie News. November 7, 2005. Accessed December 22, 2005.
Moore, Roger. "Intense performances are Peter Sarsgaard's hallmark". The Seattle Times. November 11, 2005. Accessed December 18, 2008.
Robertson, Campbell. "Also, They All Swirled Counterclockwise". The New York Times. March 3, 2006. Accessed December 17, 2008.
Aleksander, Irina. "Who's Who in Charity: New York's Most Powerful Philanthropic Boards". The New York Observer. April 1, 2008. Accessed December 17, 2008.
Robinson, Dorothy. "The 'Mysteries' of Peter". Metro New York. April 10, 2009. Accessed April 11, 2009.
Vineyard, Jennifer. "Q&A - Peter Sarsgaard Caught in Orphan's Parent Trap". AMC. July 22, 2009. Accessed July 22, 2009.
Morfoot, Addie. "Sarsgaard helps foster 'Education'. Variety. December 7, 2009. Accessed December 8, 2009.

External links

 
 
 
 Food Bank For New York City public service announcement

1971 births
20th-century American male actors
21st-century American male actors
Male actors from Illinois
American male film actors
American people of Danish descent
American male stage actors
American Roman Catholics
Bard College alumni
Gyllenhaal family
Living people
People from St. Clair County, Illinois
Washington University in St. Louis alumni
Catholics from Illinois
Fairfield College Preparatory School alumni